The Golden Fleece is an element of Greek mythology.

Golden Fleece may also refer to:
Golden Fleece (clipper), an 1855 California clipper that caught fire with a cargo of ice
Golden Fleece (horse), an Irish racehorse
The Golden Fleece (painting), an 1894 painting by Tom Roberts
Golden Fleece, Queensland, a locality in the North Burnett Region, Queensland, Australia
Golden Fleece Award, a dubious recognition in American politics
 Golden Fleece Award, an Irish arts and crafts award established by Lillias Mitchell
Golden Fleece Company, a defunct Australian retail fuel chain
Golden Fleece Inn, York, an inn in England, UK
Golden Fleece Ltd., a New York-based arts organization
Golden Fleece Mine (Colorado), a gold mine in Hinsdale County, Colorado, US
Golden Fleece Mining and Milling Company (Iowa)
Goldenfleece or Ericameria arborescens, a species of plant
Operation Golden Fleece, a 1993 non-combatant evacuation operation of the Hellenic Navy in Georgia
Golden Fleece, a LNER Class A4 steam locomotive
Golden Fleece (pirate ship), a pirate ship captained by Joseph Bannister in the late 1600s
The Golden Fleece, an 1892 novel by Julian Hawthorne
The Golden Fleece, a 1963 episode of the British thriller series The Avengers. 
Golden Fleece, a 1999 science fiction novel by Robert J. Sawyer
The Golden Fleece, a 1961 novel by John Boland
The Golden Fleece, a 1944 novel by Robert Graves
The Golden Fleece, Tales from Caucasus, a 1971 book translated from Russian to English by Avril Pyman

See also
Golden ram (disambiguation)
Order of the Golden Fleece
Order of the Golden Fleece (Georgia)
The Golden Fleecing (disambiguation)